Rakiura may refer to:

 Stewart Island/Rakiura, the third-largest island of New Zealand
 Rakiura (insect), a genus of insects endemic to New Zealand
 Rakiura National Park, a national park located on the Stewart island